Strangford (Irish: Loch Cuan, Ulster Scots: Strangfurd) is a parliamentary constituency in the United Kingdom House of Commons. The current MP is Jim Shannon of the DUP.

Constituency profile
Strangford covers the settlements either side of Strangford Lough. Despite the name, the town of Strangford is in the neighbouring South Down constituency.

The seat is strongly unionist, and one of 7 areas of Northern Ireland which voted to leave the European Union.

Boundaries

The seat was created after boundary changes in 1983, as part of an expansion of Northern Ireland's constituencies from 12 to 17, and was predominantly made up from parts of North Down. At its creation the constituency was formed from the local government district of Ards, and the Castlereagh districts of Beechill, Fourwinds, Hillfoot, Lower Braniel, Minnowburn, Moneyreagh, Newtownbreda, and Upper Braniel.

In 1995, the Commission controversially recommended abolishing the constituency and dividing it between North Down and new constituencies of Mid Down, and Castlereagh and Newtownards. This was successfully opposed in local enquiries and from the 1997 general election it was made up of parts of the districts of Ards, Castlereagh and Down.

For the 2010 general election the electoral wards which make up the constituency are:

Ballygowan, Ballyrainey, Ballywalter, Ballyhalbert, Bradshaw's Brae, Carrowdore, Central, Comber East, Comber North, Comber West, Glen, Gregstown, Killinchy, Kircubbin, Lisbane, Loughries, Movilla, Portaferry, Portavogie, Scrabo and Whitespots, from the Ards district.
From the Down district; Ballymaglave, Ballynahinch East, Derryboy, Killyleagh, Kilmore and Saintfield
The Moneyreagh ward from Castlereagh district

History
For the history of the equivalent constituencies prior to 1950 please see Down (UK Parliament constituency) and from 1950 until 1983, please see North Down.

The constituency has been represented by Unionist candidates since it was formed. There have not been significant votes for parties outside the traditional unionist block, although the Alliance has saved its deposit in every election.

The main interest in elections has been the contest between the Ulster Unionist Party (UUP) and the Democratic Unionist Party (DUP). Until 2001, the UUP were clearly ahead of the DUP in the Westminster elections, but elections to regional assemblies and local government were much closer. In 2001 the sitting MP John Taylor stood down and the contest to succeed him was fierce. The seat was won by Iris Robinson for the Democratic Unionist Party (DUP) and the subsequent 2003 assembly election saw the DUP increase their vote further.

Members of Parliament 
The first Member of Parliament for the seat was John Taylor of the Ulster Unionist Party (UUP). After the 2001 general election, he was succeeded by Iris Robinson (the wife of Peter Robinson) of the Democratic Unionist Party (DUP). Robinson resigned in January 2010 after a scandal involving financial dealings. However, no by-election was held, as the next general election was held in May.

 Note: Iris Robinson left the DUP shortly before taking Chiltern Hundreds to leave the Commons. The seat was vacant from 13 January 2010 until the general election on 6 May 2010.

Election results

Elections in the 2010s

Elections in the 2000s

Elections in the 1990s

Elections in the 1980s

See also 
 List of parliamentary constituencies in Northern Ireland

References

External links 
Politics Resources (Election results from 1922 onwards)
Electoral Calculus (Election results from 1955 onwards)
2017 Election House Of Commons Library 2017 Election report
A Vision Of Britain Through Time (Constituency elector numbers)
Politics Resources

Westminster Parliamentary constituencies in Northern Ireland
Constituencies of the Parliament of the United Kingdom established in 1983
Politics of County Down